Rheda may refer to:

 Rheda (mythology), the Latinized form of the name of an Anglo-Saxon goddess
 Rheda, Germany, a town in North Rhine-Westphalia, Germany
 Reda, Poland, a town in Pomeranian Voivodeship, Poland

See also
 Reda